Pentecost is one of the prominent feasts in the Christian liturgical year.

It is also one of the English-language names for the Jewish holiday of Shavuot.

Pentecost may also refer to:

Other religious and cultural events
 Pinksteren (Dutch word meaning "Pentecost"), often pronounced in English as "Pinkster"

Places
 Pentecost, Mississippi, U.S.
 Pentecost Island, one of the islands of Vanuatu
 Pentecost River, a river in Western Australia

People
 Pentecost Dodderidge (died c. 1650), MP for Barnstaple, England
 Denie Pentecost (born 1970), Australian footballer
 George Frederick Pentecost (1842–1920), American evangelist
 Hugh O. Pentecost (1848–1907), American minister, editor, lawyer, and lecturer
 J. Dwight Pentecost (1915–2014), American theologian
 Max Pentecost (born 1993), American baseball player
 Del Pentecost (born 1963), American actor and cast member of the 2008 play Almost an Evening

Arts, entertainment, and media
 Pentecost (El Greco), one of the canvasses that composed the Doña María de Aragón Altarpiece by El Greco
 Pentecost (film), a 2011 Irish live action short film
 Pentecost (Moretto), a 1543-1544 painting by Moretto da Brescia
 Pentecost (play), a 1994 British dramatic play
 Pentecost III, an EP by the British doom metal band Anathema

Other uses
 Pentecost University College, Sowutuom, Ghana

See also
 Pentecostalism, a Protestant Christian movement